Llinos Medi Huws (also known as Llinos Medi) is a Plaid Cymru councillor for Talybolion ward in Anglesey, Wales. She was first elected in 2013 and re-elected in 2017. She became leader of the Plaid Cymru group of councillors in Anglesey County Council in 2013. Her personal priorities are the economy, health and wellbeing of the citizens of North Wales. Her background is in supporting use of the Welsh language in schools and Young Farmer organisations.

On 23 May 2017 Medi Huws became the first woman to lead Anglesey County Council, and was among the youngest council leaders in the UK at the age of 35. She succeeded the Independent councillor Ieuan Williams as council leader. She led a coalition of 21 Plaid Cymru and independent councillors. She is also the Social Services portfolio holder.

Awards
Medi Huws was added to the list of 100 Welsh Women who have made a significant and lasting impact within their fields of expertise complied by the Women's Equality Network in 2020.

Personal life
She married, later divorced and has two children.

References

Plaid Cymru councillors
Welsh-speaking politicians
Women councillors in Wales
Year of birth missing (living people)
Living people